Sir Peter Donald Fraser (born 6 September 1963), styled The Honourable Mr Justice Fraser, is a judge of the High Court of England and Wales.

Born in County Down, Northern Ireland, he attended Harrogate Grammar School and then won an Open Exhibition to St John's College, Cambridge, from where he obtained both an MA in law and an LLM.

He was called to the Bar by Middle Temple on 21 November 1989, and was awarded a Hamsworth Exhibition and Ashbury Scholarship by the Inn. He was a summer associate in the Los Angeles office of White & Case in both 1988 and 1989, and after completing his pupillage at Atkin Chambers in Gray's Inn, he remained there in practice until he was appointed to the High Court Bench in 2015. His practice was in the field of technology, engineering, construction and international arbitration. He practised both in the UK and internationally, including in Hong Kong, China, South Africa, Sweden, Botswana, France, Dubai, Qatar, Oman, Bermuda, and the Bahamas, where he was called to the Bar in 2007. He became a Recorder of the Crown Court in 2002, sitting on the Western Circuit. He was appointed a recorder in 2002 and Queen's Counsel in 2009. He became a High Court Judge, assigned to the Queen's Bench Division, on 1 October 2015 and was made a Knight Bachelor in November 2015.

He served as the Judge in Charge of the Technology and Construction Court from 2017 to 2020, part of the Business and Property Courts that sit in the Rolls Building in London.

He has also served as an arbitrator at the International Chamber of Commerce in Paris, and is the consulting editor of Building Law Reports, having been editor from 1990–2015.

His notable cases include being the managing judge of the group litigation called Bates & Ors v Post Office Ltd, brought by 550 sub-postmasters against the Post Office over issues resulting from the Horizon IT system.

He competes as an Ironman triathlete.

References 

Living people
1963 births
Queen's Bench Division judges
21st-century British lawyers
Alumni of St John's College, Cambridge
21st-century King's Counsel
Knights Bachelor
British male triathletes
People from County Down
Barristers from Northern Ireland
Members of the Middle Temple
English barristers